This is a list containing the Billboard Hot Latin Tracks number-ones of 1995.

See also
Billboard Hot Latin Tracks

References

1995 record charts
Lists of Billboard Hot Latin Songs number-one songs
1995 in Latin music